Alphabeta were a group of Israeli singers who won the Eurovision Song Contest in 1978 with Izhar Cohen.

The singers were Reuven Erez, Lisa Gold-Rubin, Nehama Shutan, Esther Tzuberi, and Itzhak Okev. The winning song was A-Ba-Ni-Bi. Israel received five consecutive maximum 12 points during the voting, a Eurovision Song Contest record. The total score for the song was 157 points.

When it became clear that Israel was going to win the contest, Jordan stopped its live broadcast on the pretext of technical difficulties. The viewing public was shown a picture of daffodils.  A day later, Jordan presented the song from Belgium, which came in second, as the winning song. This victory entitled Israel to host the contest in Jerusalem in 1979.

The head of the Israeli delegation, Rivka Michaeli, said that Cohen's song was sent to the contest because the other entries in the Israeli national competition were so bad. Nevertheless, Izhar Cohen was said to be confident that he would win.

See also
Music of Israel

References

Eurovision Song Contest winners
Eurovision Song Contest entrants for Israel
Eurovision Song Contest entrants of 1978
Israeli pop music groups